The Groninger Dagblad is a former regional newspaper from the Netherlands. It was published from 1992 until 2002. It was a merger of the Winschoter Courant (1870) and De Noord-Ooster (founded 1904; a daily since 1946). In 2002, it merged with the Nieuwsblad van het Noorden and the Drentse Courant into the Dagblad van het Noorden.

References 

1992 establishments in the Netherlands
2002 disestablishments in the Netherlands
Defunct newspapers published in the Netherlands
Dutch-language newspapers
Mass media in Groningen (province)
Publications established in 1990
Publications disestablished in 2002
Daily newspapers published in the Netherlands